Give Us Wings is a 1940 Universal comedic film starring the Dead End Kids and the Little Tough Guys. Several members of the casts of those series were also featured in "The East Side Kids" films.

In the years before World War II, the United States government encouraged Hollywood studios to produce films that would encourage youth to join the resurgent armed forces, especially the U.S. Army Air Corps. Give Us Wings joined 20,000 Men a Year (1939), I Wanted Wings (1941), Flying Cadets (1941) and others of that genre, as a patriotic "flag-waver".

Plot
Tom, Pig, String, Ape, and Rap, collectively known as "The Dead End Kids", are learning to become aeronautical mechanics in the National Youth Administration Work Program plant. The Kids really want to fly and think they have learned enough to become pilots.

Their dreams of flight will not come true because the Civil Aeronautics Authority flight school requires them to have completed high school, something none of them have achieved. Seeking out a flight school, the Kids go to work for unscrupulous crop dusting operator Arnold Carter. Quickly realizing that pilot training is unlikely, Carter's manager, Mr. York puts them to work as mechanics.

Carter's aircraft are old and his only pilot, "Tex" Austin feels that the boys are far too inexperienced to fly, but Carter is desperate to keep the crop dusting operation going, and after Tex crashes, the boys are forced to take over. York finally agrees that the boys, except for Rap who is terrified of flying after witnessing the Tex's crash, can fly, and they take to the air.

Aware of the dangers of its tall groves of trees, York refuses to dust a particular field but Carter convinces Rap to do the job. While flying over the trees, Rap crashes to his death. Losing his nerve, Carter tries to make a getaway in an aircraft, but Tom follows in another craft and forces him to earth with a dose of dust. He is met by the other boys, who turn him over to the authorities.

Cast

The Dead End Kids

 Billy Halop as Tom
 Huntz Hall as Pig
 Gabriel Dell as String
 Bernard Punsly as Ape
 Bobby Jordan as Rap

The Little Tough Guys
 Harris Berger - Bud
 Billy Benedict - Link

Additional cast

 Wallace Ford as Mr. York
 Anne Gwynne as Julie Mason
 Victor Jory as Mr. Arnold Carter
 Shemp Howard as "Buzz Berger" (a.k.a. Whitey)
 Milburn Stone as "Tex" Austin

Production
Give Us Wings  was based on Eliot Gibbon's story, "Men of Dust". Principal photography on Give Us Wings began in late August 1940. The film was one of the last of the prewar aviation films in which the Associated Motion Picture Pilots Association was involved.

Reception
Aviation film historian Stephen Pendo, in Aviation in the Cinema (1985) noted Give Us Wings was a comedy vehicle for two noted film comedy teams with a heavy reliance on slapstick antics.

The contemporary film review of Give Us Wings by Bosley Crowther in The New York Times, noted, "'Give Us Wings' is not a good, or even a passable, entertainment; in fact, it is so bad that it often is quite amusing. That may sound like a contradiction, but we'll wager audiences will find themselves in the embarrassing position of laughing involuntary at the lunatic doings."

Aviation film historian James M. Farmer in Celluloid Wings: The Impact of Movies on Aviation (1984), had a similar reaction, saying that Give Us Wings (was) "A terrible film even by Dead End standards."

References

Notes

Citations

Bibliography

 Farmer, James H. Celluloid Wings: The Impact of Movies on Aviation (1st ed.). Blue Ridge Summit, Pennsylvania: TAB Books 1984. .
 Pendo, Stephen. Aviation in the Cinema. Lanham, Maryland: Scarecrow Press, 1985. .
 Wynne, H. Hugh. The Motion Picture Stunt Pilots and Hollywood's Classic Aviation Movies. Missoula, Montana: Pictorial Histories Publishing Co., 1987. .

External links
 
 
 

1940 films
1940 crime films
American black-and-white films
American aviation films
Films directed by Charles Lamont
American crime films
Universal Pictures films
1940s English-language films
1940s American films